Anthelupt is a commune in the Meurthe-et-Moselle department (Grand Est Region) in northeastern France.

Population

See also
Communes of the Meurthe-et-Moselle department

References

Communes of Meurthe-et-Moselle